Stöhr is a German surname and it may refer to:

 Adolph Stöhr, German professor of philosophy
 Franz Stöhr, German politician 
 Georg Stöhr, German fencer
 Henry Stöhr, German judoka
 Joachim Stöhr, German physicist
 Richard Stöhr, Austrian composer
 Willi Stöhr, German NSDAP official
 Wolfgang Stöhr, German ski jumper

See also
 Stohr (disambiguation)
 Stoehr surname page

German-language surnames
Surnames from nicknames